Stillwater High School is a public secondary school in Stillwater, Oklahoma, United States. It is located at 1224 North Husband Street in Stillwater, Oklahoma and the only high school in Stillwater Public Schools.

History
The first Senior Class graduated from Stillwater High School in 1901. The earliest students of Stillwater High School attended classes in the Alcott Building constructed in 1896 at Ninth and Duck Street. The Horace Mann School was built 1910 at the same location to accommodate expanding enrollments. The Stillwater High School or South High was built in 1918 at Twelfth and Duck Street. South High is considered by many to be the first real high school. The building has since been renovated and is part of the Stillwater Public Library. In the early 1940s, Stillwater High moved to the North High location at Ninth and Duck Street. This is the building that many refer to as the “Old High School.” It is now the Stillwater Community Center and location of the Stillwater/C.E. Donart Alumni Association and Museum.

By 1960 Stillwater High had a new location and a new name with the construction and dedication of the campus on North Main and Husband Street. Stillwater High School was renamed for Mr. C.E. Donart—honoring his fifty years of service as the clerk of the Stillwater Board of Education and his efforts to build the new high school. The school returned to the original name of Stillwater High School by 1982. Recent additions to the high school at the North Main and Husband location include the Performing Arts Center and Pioneer Stadium.

Extracurricular activities

Clubs and organizations

Afro-Am Club
Art Club
Beta Club
Book Club
DECA
Disc Golf & Ultimate Club 
Theatre Club 
FCA
FCCLA
FFA
French Club
Gender and Sexuality Alliance
Health and Fitness Club
History Club
International Club
Junior Class
Key Club
Mu Alpha Theta
National French Honor Society
National Honor Society
Native American Student Association
Poetry Club
P90x club
Senior Class
Stillwater Makes A Change (SMAC) 
Sophomore Class
Spanish Club
Student Council
Students for Human Rights
HIV Awareness 
SWAT
Young Democrats
Youth in Government
Debate Club 
Young Republicans 
Yarn Club 
Gamers Club

Athletics

Baseball
Basketball - Boys
Basketball - Girls
Cheerleading
Cross Country
Football
Golf - Boys
Golf - Girls
Pom
Soccer - Boys
Soccer - Girls
Softball
Swimming
Tennis - Boys
Tennis - Girls
Track
Volleyball
Wrestling

Performing arts

Band
Chorale
Drama
Orchestra

Other

Academic Team

Notable alumni
 Brett Anderson, MLB pitcher
 Josh Fields, former MLB infielder
 Sunny Golloway, head baseball coach at East Central University
 Jackson Holliday, baseball shortstop, selected with the first overall pick in the 2022 Major League Baseball draft
 Matt Holliday, former MLB outfielder
 Moe Iba, former basketball coach
 Howard Keys, former NFL player
 Jimmy LaFave, folk musician
 Tyson Ritter, musician and actor, frontman of The All-American Rejects
 Jackie Shipp, football coach. 
 Artie Smith, former NFL player
 Nick Wheeler, musician, guitarist of The All-American Rejects
 Ab Wright, former NFL and MLB player
 Jim "Bad News" Barnes, former NBA 1st Round Draft Pick, first black basketball player to ever win the Oklahoma Player of the Year Award, 1964 Olympic Gold Medal winner (Basketball).

References

External links
 

Public high schools in Oklahoma
Schools in Payne County, Oklahoma
Buildings and structures in Stillwater, Oklahoma